The Men's Long Jump event at the 2005 World Championships in Athletics was held at the Helsinki Olympic Stadium on August 12 and August 13.

Medalists

Qualification

Heat 1
 Godfrey Khotso Mokoena, South Africa 8.22m Q
 Salim Sdiri, France 8.18m Q
 Vitaliy Shkurlatov, Russia 7.95m q
 Christopher Tomlinson, Great Britain 7.83m
 Ibrahim Camejo, Cuba 7.78m
 Miguel Pate, United States 7.70m
 Jonathan Chimier, Mauritius 7.65m
 Povilas Mykolaitis, Lithuania 7.64m
 Walter Davis, United States 7.42m
 Yahya Berrabah, Morocco 7.33m
 Morten Jensen, Denmark NM
 Leevan Sands, Bahamas NM
 Jadel Gregório, Brazil DNS

Heat 2
 Dwight Phillips, United States 8.59m Q
 Tommi Evilä, Finland 8.18m Q (NR)
 James Beckford, Jamaica 8.13m Q
 Issam Nima, Algeria 8.13m Q (NR)
 Ignisious Gaisah, Ghana 8.11m Q
 Joan Lino Martínez, Spain 8.10m Q
 Irving Saladino, Panama 7.98m q
 Volodymyr Zyuskov, Ukraine 7.97m q
 Nils Winter, Germany 7.91m q
 Brian Johnson, United States 7.91m
 Shinichi Terano, Japan 7.27m
 Eroni Tuivanuavou, Fiji 7.17m (SB)
 Iván Pedroso, Cuba NM
 Bogdan Tarus, Romania NM

Final

External links
IAAF results, heats
IAAF results, final

Long jump
Long jump at the World Athletics Championships